The 1983–84 Arkansas Razorbacks men's basketball team represented the University of Arkansas during the 1983–84 NCAA Division I men's basketball season. The head coach was Eddie Sutton, serving for his 10th year. The team played its home games in Barnhill Arena in Fayetteville, Arkansas. This team finished second in the SWC regular season standings, ending Houston's 39-game conference winning streak in the regular season finale. The Cougars avenged that loss to the Hogs in the championship game of the conference tournament. Earlier in the season, Arkansas upset No. 1 North Carolina to hand the Tar Heels their first loss after opening with 21 consecutive wins. As No. 2 seed in the East region of the 1984 NCAA Tournament, the Razorbacks were defeated by eventual Final Four participant Virginia in the second round in OT.

Roster

Schedule and results

|-
!colspan=9 style=| Regular Season

|-
!colspan=9 style=| SWC Tournament

|-
!colspan=9 style=| NCAA Tournament

Rankings

Awards and honors
Alvin Robertson – All-American
Joe Kleine – Honorable Mention AP All-American

1984 NBA Draft

References

Arkansas Razorbacks men's basketball seasons
Arkansas
Arkansas
1983 in sports in Arkansas
1984 in sports in Arkansas